Narrung may refer to the following places in Australia:

Narrung, South Australia, a town and locality
Narrung, Victoria, a locality
Narrung Peninsula, a peninsula in South Australia